Richter City Roller Derby is a women's flat track roller derby league based in Wellington, New Zealand. Founded in 2007, the league currently consists of three intraleague teams, and two interleague teams.  The league's colours are orange and purple. Richter City is a member of the Women's Flat Track Derby Association (WFTDA).

History
Richter City gained early publicity by performing demonstrations at the 2008 Dance Your Socks Off! Festival. Their first bout in March 2009 sold out the basketball hall used as the venue.

In late 2009, the league held its first season of intraleague competition, which saw crowds averaging 950 people. In mid-season the league moved its bouts to TSB Bank Arena as spectator crowds were exceeding the capacity of the previous venue, a basketball hall.

In 2011 the league won the Air New Zealand Personality of the Year Award at the Wellington Sports Awards, beating Lower Hutt boxing identity Billy Graham, All Black Piri Weepu, and veteran sports broadcaster Keith Quinn in the popular vote.

In July 2012, Richter City was accepted as a member of the Women's Flat Track Derby Association Apprentice Programme, and became a full WFTDA member in December 2013.

Intraleague Competition

In 2009 and 2010 two teams contested the intraleague competition; Brutal Pageant (pink & red/beauty pageant theme) and Smash Malice (leopard print/trailer trash theme). By mid-2010, a bout attracted a crowd of more than 3,500 people. In 2011 the intraleague competition was expanded to include a third team; Comic Slams (blue & silver/super hero and Comic Sans font theme). Comic Slams made the season final, but were beaten by Smash Malice in the title bout.

Domestic Interleague Competition
Richter City has two interleague teams. The A Team are called the All Stars and the B team are called the Convicts.

In late 2009, Richter City hosted New Zealand's first intercity bout, against Pirate City Rollers' All Scars, losing 88–174 in front of a crowd of 1,200 people. In December 2010, the All Stars faced the All Scars again, this time in Auckland, with the Pirate City team victorious again.

In 2011, both of Richter City's interleague teams faced multiple opponents:

All Stars

WFTDA rankings

Convicts

International Competition
In June 2010 several Richter City skaters attended the Great Southern Slam, the Asia-Pacific region's first roller derby tournament, skating as guests of Western Australia Roller Derby. The league itself did not compete.

In March 2011 Richter City hosted New Zealand's first international roller derby bout, pitting the All Stars against the Sydney Roller Derby League's Assassins. The All Stars lost the bout 164–128. In November 2011 the Richter City All Stars traveled to Sydney for the away leg of their home and away tie against the Sydney Assassins.  Again the Assassins proved too strong.

In October 2011, Richter City skater Merryn "Tuff Bikkies" McAulay and former Richter City skater Michelle "Perky Nah Nah" Jackson were selected to play for Roller Derby Team New Zealand at the inaugural Roller Derby World Cup, played in Toronto in December 2011. The New Zealand team placed 8th out of 13 teams.

References

Roller derby leagues in New Zealand
Sport in Wellington
Roller derby leagues established in 2007
2007 establishments in New Zealand